Zambia Shall Be Free is a 1962 political autobiography by Zambia's first president Kenneth Kaunda that was published as part of the Heinemann African Writers Series. The biography is a critique of colonial rule, and the power of democracy in liberating the varied people ruled in the new Zambia.

The contemporary journal reviewer for African Affairs called the work a "haphazard sketch of the victorious approach of Northern Rhodesia to emancipation". The reviewer called the narrative "polemical" and "factually unreliable". The Journal of Modern African Studies reviewer J.G. Markham was more sympathetic, reading the biography as a strong understanding of Kaunda's development of his political career, and highlighting the tension between Kaunda's participation in violence in the Zambia African Congress and his subsequent justification of that violence in seeking independence.

References

Further reading 
 

Autobiographies
1962 non-fiction books
African Writers Series
Political autobiographies
Zambian literature